Abhyāsa, in Hinduism, is a spiritual practice which is regularly and constantly practised over a long period of time. It has been prescribed by the great sage Patanjali Maharishi in his Yoga Sutras, and by Lord Krishna in the Bhagavad Gita as an essential means to control the mind, together with Vairāgya.

Sutra 1:12 "Both practice (abhyāsa) and non-reaction (vairāgya) are required to still the patterning of consciousness."

Sutra 1:13 "Practice is the sustained effort to rest in that stillness."—as translated by Chip Hartranft in his work The Yoga Sutra of Patanjali. According to Swami Krishnananda sutra 1:13 means "Abhyasa or practice is the effort to fix one's own self in a given attitude." Prolonged periods of practice within a given attitude to align ourselves with our soul's freedom, this is practice. Our attitude is fixing series of mistakes by ourselves such that we "tend to greater and greater stages of freedom of the soul, and a lessening and decreasing of the intensity of bondage."

References

Hindu philosophical concepts
Yoga concepts